Owghaz Tazeh (also Romanized as Owghāz Tāzeh, Owghāz-e Tāzeh, and Ūghāz Tāzeh; also known as Taza Oghāz and Tāzeh Owghāz) is a village in Sivkanlu Rural District, in the Central District of Shirvan County, North Khorasan Province, Iran. At the 2006 census, its population was 579, in 172 families.

References 

Populated places in Shirvan County